Lihula JK is an Estonian football club based in Lihula. Founded in 2009, they currently play in the III Liiga, the fifth tier of Estonian football.

Players

Current squad
 ''As of 16 June 2017.

Statistics

League and Cup

References

Lääneranna Parish
Football clubs in Estonia
Association football clubs established in 2009